Rudolph Rodrigues (18 August 1932 – 9 December 2017) was a prominent leader of the Anglo-Indian community in India. He was a Member of Parliament, representing Anglo-Indian reserved seats in the Lok Sabha, the lower house of India's Parliament as a member of the Janata Party.

References

Nominated members of the Lok Sabha
Janata Party politicians
1932 births
2017 deaths